Homestead is an unincorporated community in Baker County, in the U.S. state of Oregon.

The community was named for the homestead claim of Frank E. Pearce, who conducted operations at the nearby Iron Dyke Mine around 1900. J. H. Pearson was the first postmaster of the Homestead post office, which operated until May 1, 1965. The post office at Oxbow then replaced the office at Homestead.

Homestead was platted around 1898 along a Northwest Railway Company line that never developed. It thrived because of the patronage of the miners from the Iron Dyke Mine and because it was the railhead for local orchards.

From 1953 to 1960, Homestead was the starting point for passenger boat trips down the Snake River to Lewiston, Idaho operated by Blaine Stubblefield.

References

External links
 Hells Canyon -- Man, Land, and History in the Deepest Gorge on Earth

Unincorporated communities in Baker County, Oregon
Populated places established in 1898
1898 establishments in Oregon
Unincorporated communities in Oregon